Forest City, formerly known as "Burnt Chimney," is a town in Rutherford County, North Carolina, United States. The population was 7,377 as of the 2020 census, making it the largest municipality in Rutherford County.

History
The Alexander Manufacturing Company Mill Village Historic District, Cool Springs High School, East Main Street Historic District, Forest City Baptist Church, James Dexter Ledbetter House, Main Street Historic District, T. Max Watson House, and West Main Street Historic District are listed on the National Register of Historic Places.

Geography

Forest City is located at  (35.331128, -81.870107). The town lies along a merged stretch of U.S. Route 221A and U.S. Route 74 Bus. This merged highway widens into a four-lane boulevard as it passes through the town's historic district. The town of Spindale borders Forest City to the west, and the town of Bostic lies just to the northeast.

In 1999, Alexander Mills merged with and became a part of Forest City.

Demographics

2020 census

As of the 2020 United States census, there were 7,377 people, 3,128 households, and 1,582 families residing in the town.

2014
The population recorded for the town in 2014 was recorded to be 7,324 people. Forest City made up 0.002% of the total U.S. population and 0.07% of the total North Carolina State population in 2014.  The number of households reported from 2014 to 2018 was 3,182 and the number of people per household was reported to be 2.23. The percentage of people aged 5 or older that speak a language other than English at home was 8.4% as recorded from 2014 to 2018. The population density in 2014 was 853.12 per square mile (p/mi^2). The racial makeup of the town was 70.5% white alone, 23.9% black alone, 0.1% American Indian and Alaska Native alone, 0.6% Asian alone, 0.2% two or more races, 9.0% Hispanic or Latino of any race, and 66.5% white alone, not Hispanic or Latino. The number of veterans recorded from 2014 to 2018 was 278. The percentage of foreign-born persons was recorded from 2014 to 2018 as 3.6% of the population. 

There were 3,245 households, out of which 27.2% had children under the age of 18 living with them, 39.5% were married couples living together, 19.3% had a female householder with no husband present, and 37.5% were non-families. 33.9% of all households were made up of individuals, and 16.6% had someone living alone who was 65 years of age or older. The average household size was 2.28 and the average family size was 2.90.

The reported percentage of people under the age of five years old in the town was 6.2%. The percentage of people under the age of 18 years old was 25.5%. The percentage of people 65 years old and over was 20.5%. The percentage of female persons was 55.3%, making the percentage of male persons 44.7%. 

The median household income from 2014 to 2018, in terms of the worth of the dollar in 2018, was $27,861. The income per capita for the prior 12 months, as recorded from 2014 to 2018, was $17,716. The percentage of persons in poverty was 31.8%.

Government 
The Town of Forest City is governed by a mayor and a board of commissioners. Steve Holland is currently serving as the Mayor of The Town of Forest City. The Town Board of Commissioners includes: Mayor Pro-Tem, Dr. Dee Dee Bright, Com. Chris Lee, Com. Shawn Moore, Com. Justin Conner, and Com. David Eaker. In 1929 the mayor was Charles Z. Flack. He is noted for building the original City Hall and was the first mayor to begin the tradition of decorating Main St. by stringing Christmas lights over the road.

Attractions
Forest City has many museums, ranging from the Rutherford County Farm Museum to the Bennett Classical Auto Museum.

Forest City is also home to the Forest City Owls baseball club which is a member of the Coastal Plain League, a collegiate summer league. The Owls who play at McNair Field in Forest City, won the CPL championship in 2009 with a record of 51-9, again in 2010 and were ranked as the #1 collegiate summer team in America.

Education
The local school district is Rutherford County Schools, which is based in Forest City.

Higher education 
Isothermal Community College is located close by in Spindale, NC. The tuition ranges from $131.00 to $1,281.00 depending on the number of credit hours.  The college provides the Lee L. Powers Service Scholarship to those who reside in Rutherford or Polk Counties and receive in-state tuition which will cover all costs of attending the college.

Economy
In 2010, Forest City was selected as the location for a new $450 million data center for Facebook. 

Renovations done to the town in 2019 added Forest City Pavilion on Park Square. The venue was designed by Odom Engineering, PLLC. This was a multimillion-dollar project that was undertaken by the town that attracts tourists and increased the value of surrounding homes. 

The Thermal Belt Rail Trail project, a bike and walking trail spanning 13.36 miles, was completed, in part, to develop the town’s economy. 

The Rutherford County Chamber of Commerce and Rutherford County Economic Development partnered to offer an Emergency Small Business Assistance Grant in response to the pandemic caused by the spread of COVID-19. The grant provides a maximum of $2,500 per company. 

The total percentage of people aged 16 and older in Forest City that made up the labor force according to the census reported from 2014 to 2018 was 48.7%. The percentage of women recorded in the labor force aged 16 or older was 45.9% from 2014 to 2018 according to information provided by the census. The total number of people that received health care and social assistance receipts/revenue in 2012 ($1,000) was 87,506. The total retail sales reported in 2012 ($1,000) was 403,012.

Notable people
 Woody Abernathy, former MLB pitcher
 Todd Coffey, former MLB pitcher
 Rob Gray, professional basketball player
 Venson Hamilton, professional basketball player
 Bob McNair, businessman, philanthropist, and sports executive

References

External links

 
 Museums of Forest City

 
Towns in Rutherford County, North Carolina
Towns in North Carolina